Luis García-Berlanga Martí (12 June 1921 – 13 November 2010) was a Spanish film director and screenwriter. Acclaimed as a pioneer of modern Spanish cinema, his films are marked by social satire and acerbic critiques of Spanish culture under the Francoist dictatorship.

Life and career
When he was young, Berlanga decided to study law and then philosophy, but in 1947 he decided to enter the Institute of Cinematographic Investigations and Experiences (Instituto de Investigaciones y Experiencias Cinematográficas) in Madrid.

In his youth he enrolled in the Blue Division in the Eastern Front of World War II to avoid his father's execution as a Republican politician. His debut as a film director in 1951 was with the film That Happy Couple in which he worked with Juan Antonio Bardem. With Bardem, he is considered to be one of Spanish film renovators after the Spanish Civil War. Among his films are several concerning Spanish film history, such as Welcome Mr. Marshall! or The Executioner. Bardem and he cofounded a film magazine, Objetivo, in 1953.  The magazine existed until 1956. He worked on seven occasions with screenwriter Rafael Azcona.

Characteristic of his films are their sense of irony and the satires of different social and political situations. During the Francoist State, his ability to outwit the censors allowed him to make daring projects such as Miracles on Thursdays.

In 1968, he was head of the jury at the 18th Berlin International Film Festival.

In 1986 he received the Prince of Asturias Award for Arts and in 1993 the Goya for best director for Everyone to Jail! His film Plácido was nominated in 1961 for the Academy Award for Best Foreign Language Film, Gold Medal for Fine Art (Medalla de Oro de las Bellas Artes) in 1981, Spanish National Cinematography Prize (Premio Nacional de Cinematografía) in 1980, and has been granted with the Italian Commendatore Order.

Berlanga won international prizes at several important film festivals: Cannes Film Festival, International Film Festival of Valencia, Montreal World Film Festival, and Berlin Film Festival. At the Karlovy Vary International Film Festival he won a prize as one of the world's ten most prominent film directors. He has also been awarded a large number of national acknowledgements.

Filmography as director
 Welcome Mr. Marshall! (¡Bienvenido Mister Marshall!) (1952)
Esa pareja feliz  (1953) co-written and co-directed
 Novio a la vista  (1954)
 Calabuch  (1956)
 Miracles on Thursdays   (Los jueves, milagro) (1957)
 Plácido  (1961)
 Las cuatro verdades (1962)
 El Verdugo  (1963)
 Las Pirañas   (aka La boutique, in Spain) (1967)
 ¡Vivan los novios!  (1969)
   (1973)
 La escopeta nacional  (1977)
 Patrimonio nacional (1981)
 Nacional III (1982)
 La vaquilla  (1985)
 Moros y Cristianos (film)  (1987)
 Everyone to Jail!  (¡Todos a la cárcel!) (1993)
 París-Tombuctú  (1999)
 El sueño de la maestra   (2002)

Filmography as actor
 Días de viejo color (1968) (actor)
 No somos de piedra (1968) (actor)
 Corazón de bombón (2000) (actor)
 Hola Artemio (2001) (actor)
 Strangers to Themselves (Extranjeros de sí mismos) documentary (2001) (actor)

See also
 Café Gijón (Madrid)

References

External links

 Luis García Berlanga – Luis Garcia Berlanga's biography at Senses of Cinema
 Luis García Berlanga – In Spanish
 Berlanga Film Museum - In English

1921 births
2010 deaths
People from Valencia
Spanish film directors
Spanish military personnel of World War II
Best Director Goya Award winners
Spanish magazine founders